Jacob Jackson (born April 25, 2000) is an American professional soccer player who plays as a goalkeeper for Major League Soccer club New England Revolution.

Career

College and amateur
Jackson was born in San Diego, California, and played his college career at Loyola Marymount between 2019 and 2021, making 42 appearances.  Named the West Coast Conference Goalkeeper of the Year and an All-WCC First Team selection in 2020 and 2021.

Jackson also played for Real Salt Lake Academy, San Diego Surf Academy, and San Diego Soccer Club.

Professional
On January 18, 2022, Jackson was selected by the New England Revolution in the first round (24 overall) of the MLS SuperDraft.

On February 15, 2022, Jackson signed with the Revs, keeping his college jersey number 98.

Jackson has been on loan to the MLS Next Pro affiliate, New England Revolution II.  Jackson won the Goalkeeper of the Month award in for May 2022.

Career statistics

Club

References

External links
 

Living people
2000 births
American soccer players
Association football goalkeepers
Loyola Marymount Lions men's soccer players
Major League Soccer players
New England Revolution draft picks
New England Revolution players
New England Revolution II players
People from San Diego
Soccer players from California
MLS Next Pro players